The  Bryan House near Doyline, Louisiana was built in about 1835.  It has also been known as Plant House and as Ranch Azalee.  It was listed on the National Register of Historic Places in 1999.

It was built originally as a one-and-a-half-story log dogtrot structure.  It was expanded 10 or 20 years later and included vernacular Federal and Greek Revival details.

References

Houses on the National Register of Historic Places in Louisiana
Dogtrot architecture in Louisiana
Federal architecture in Louisiana
Houses completed in 1835
Webster Parish, Louisiana